Ernst Illing (April 6, 1904 - November 30, 1946) was medical director of the Vienna Psychiatric-Neurological Clinic for Children Am Spiegelgrund clinic, where hundreds of children were murdered during World War II. After joining the Nazi Party in 1933, Illing, who was born in Leipzig, held various positions, including senior physician for the Luftwaffe, before becoming director of the Spiegelgrund clinic in 1942. In 1946, he was found guilty of torture and abuse resulting in death for murdering over 250 children, sentenced to death, and ordered to forfeit all of his assets. Illing was hanged later that year.

References

1904 births
1946 deaths
20th-century executions by Austria
Nazis convicted of war crimes
People executed for war crimes
Holocaust perpetrators in Austria
German people executed abroad
Nazis executed in Austria
People from Leipzig
People executed by Austria by hanging
Executed mass murderers